All American Alien Boy is the second studio album by Ian Hunter. Because of management issues, Mick Ronson did not appear on this album; instead, Hunter brought in keyboardist Chris Stainton to act as a balancing force in the studio. Unlike his previous album, the album didn't feature any of his trademark rockers (apart from "Restless Youth") and he opted for a more jazzy direction including bassist Jaco Pastorius. The album title is a play on Rick Derringer's 1973 album All American Boy. Queen appear as backing vocalists on the track "You Nearly Did Me In".

In 2006, the album was reissued with several bonus tracks.

Track listing
All songs written by Ian Hunter.

Side one
 "Letter to Britannia from the Union Jack" – 3:48
 "All American Alien Boy" – 7:07
 "Irene Wilde" – 3:43
 "Restless Youth" – 6:17

Side two
 "Rape" – 4:20
 "You Nearly Did Me In" – 5:46
 "Apathy 83" – 4:43
 "God (Take 1)" – 5:45

30th Anniversary bonus tracks
 "To Rule Britannia from Union Jack" (session outtake) – 4:08 
 "All American Alien Boy" (early single version) – 4:03 
 "Irene Wilde (Number One)" (session outtake) – 3:53 
 "Weary Anger" (session outtake) – 5:45 
 "Apathy" (session outtake) – 4:42 
 "(God) Advice to a Friend" (session outtake) – 5:34

Charts

Personnel
 Ian Hunter – lead vocals, rhythm guitar, piano on "All American Alien Boy", backing vocals
 Chris Stainton – piano, organ, mellotron, bass guitar on "Restless Youth"
 Jaco Pastorius – bass guitar all tracks, guitar on track "God (Take I)"
 Aynsley Dunbar – drums
 Jerry Weems – lead guitar
 David Sanborn – saxophone
 Dominic Cortese – accordion
 Cornell Dupree – guitar on "Letter to Brittania From the Union Jack"
 Don Alias – congas
 Arnie Lawrence – clarinet
 Dave Bargeron – trombone
 Lewis Soloff – trumpet
 Freddie Mercury – backing vocals on "You Nearly Did Me In"
 Brian May – backing vocals on "You Nearly Did Me In"
 Roger Taylor – backing vocals on "You Nearly Did Me In"
 Bob Segarini – backing vocals
 Ann E. Sutton – backing vocals
 Gail Kantor – backing vocals
 Erin Dickins – backing vocals

References

1976 albums
Ian Hunter (singer) albums
Columbia Records albums
Albums recorded at Electric Lady Studios